Giovanni Ventimiglia  is a Swiss–Italian philosopher. He is full Professor of Philosophy at the University of Lucerne (Switzerland) and Vice Dean of its Faculty of Theology. He is director of the new Centre for Theology and Philosophy of Religions. Between 2017 and 2022, he was Visiting Professor of Medieval Philosophy in philosophy at the University of Italian Switzerland. He is (founding) President of the Reginaldus Foundation, Switzerland.

From 2004 to 2016 he was ordinary professor of Theoretical Philosophy at the Faculty of Theology, Lugano, where he founded the Institute for Philosophical Studies (ISFI) (formerly the Istituto di Filosofia applicata) in 2003 (Director 2003-2017). In 2015 he founded the Aristotle College, of which he was Honorary President until 2020.

Giovanni Ventimiglia works primarily on Thomas Aquinas, Thomism, often at the intersections of the continental and analytical traditions of philosophy (analytical Thomism). His main interests lie in classical ontology (analogy and senses of being, God as Being, God’s names, transcendentals and medieval logic, transcendental multiplicity), and its relation to contemporary debates in analytic metaphysics. He also works on the reception of Plato’s “unwritten” doctrines in medieval commentaries on Aristotle’s Metaphysics, the reception of Aristotle’s philosophy in medieval theology and philosophy, and the reception of Aquinas in contemporary philosophy. He has also worked on the ontology of material, digital objects and of cyberspace and the relation between philosophy and psychoanalysis.

Bibliography (selection)
 Aquinas After Frege, Palgrave Macmillan, London, 2020.
 Tommaso d’Aquino, La Scuola, Brescia 2014; transl. into Portuguese: São Paulo (forthcoming), transl. into Spanish: Bogotà (forthcoming);
 L’ente, l’essenza e l’esistenza. Prime nozioni di ontologia in prospettiva analitico-tomistica, Eupress-FTL, Lugano 2012;
 Distinctio realis. Ontologie aristotelico-tomistiche nella prima metà del Novecento, Eupress-FTL, Lugano 2012;
 To be o esse? La questione dell’essere nel tomismo analitico, Carocci, Roma 2012 (double-blind peer-reviewed);
 Se Dio sia uno. Essere, Trinità, inconscio, Preface by P. Coda, Editrice ETS, Pisa 2002;
 Differenza e contraddizione. Il problema dell’essere in Tommaso d’Aquino, Preface by A. Bausola, Vita e Pensiero, Milano 1997;

External links 
 Giovanni Ventimiglia (University of Lucerne
 Institute for Philosophical Studies 
 Aristotle College
 University of Italian Switzerland
 “Thomistic Metaphysics and Analytical Metaphysics”

Analytic philosophers
1964 births
Writers from Palermo
Living people
Italian philosophers
Giovanni
Analytical Thomists